

The lists of cultivars in the table below are indices of plant cultivars, varieties, and strains. A cultivar is a plant that is selected for desirable characteristics that can be maintained by propagation.

The plants listed may be ornamental, medicinal, and/or edible. Several of them bear edible fruit. Plants are selectively bred for phenotypic traits (such as flower colour) and other hereditary traits. When developing a new variety, a plant breeder might value such characteristics as appearance, disease resistance, and hardiness. In the cultivation of edible fruit and vegetables, nutritional value, shelf life, and crop yield are also among the potential considerations.

Some of the lists use the word variety instead of cultivar. In most of these lists, variety refers to a cultivar that is recognised by the International Union for the Protection of New Varieties of Plants (UPOV). A cultivar must meet certain criteria in order to be recognised by UPOV as a named variety.

In a few lists, variety means something else: a taxonomic rank below that of species (a kind of subspecies). If the species' binomial name is followed by the word var. and another name, that is a botanical variety, not a cultivar.

See also

 Cultivated plant taxonomy
 Genetic variation
 Horticulture
 Introduction to genetics
 Landrace

External links